Frank M. Gibson (born 1916 or 1917) is a Canadian businessman who was a member of a group of businessmen who pushed for the merging of the Hamilton Wildcats and Hamilton Tigers football clubs to form the Hamilton Tiger-Cats in 1950. He was inducted into the Canadian Football Hall of Fame as a builder in 1996. The CFL's Frank M. Gibson Trophy for Outstanding Rookie in the Eastern Division is named in his honour. Gibson also served as secretary-treasurer for the CFL's East Division from 1962 to 1980 and was an administrative consultant with the Tiger-Cats until 1983. He also served in the capacity of treasurer, and later secretary-treasurer, as well as on the board of governors of the Tiger-Cats. In 1959 he played a role in investigating the possibility of an interlocking schedule for the CFL's two divisions, which would be implemented in 1960. In 1996, he was living in Ancaster, Ontario.

References

1910s births
Possibly living people
Year of birth uncertain
Hamilton Tiger-Cats personnel
Canadian Football Hall of Fame inductees